Ramona Mibuy Ndong Nse (born 28 June 2002) is an Equatorial Guinean footballer who plays as a midfielder for Malabo Kings FC and the Equatorial Guinea women's national team. She competed for Equatorial Guinea at the 2018 Africa Women Cup of Nations, playing in three matches. She also represented the country at under-20 level at the 2019 African Games.

References

External links

2002 births
Living people
Equatoguinean women's footballers
Women's association football midfielders
Equatorial Guinea women's international footballers
Competitors at the 2019 African Games
African Games competitors for Equatorial Guinea